Andrew Grene (1965–2010) was a dual Irish-American citizen who worked with the United Nations. He was the sole Irish citizen lost in the Haiti earthquake of 2010.
Prior to Haiti, he worked at the United Nations as a speechwriter for Boutros Boutros-Ghali, and then as a civil affairs officer in peacekeeping in the Central African Republic, Eritrea, and East Timor. He served in Haiti from 2008 until his death.
He was the son of David Grene, classics translator and professor at the Committee on Social Thought, University of Chicago, and the twin brother of musician Gregory Grene. 
The Irish State inaugurated a perpetual scholarship in his name following his death, the Andrew Grene Conflict Resolution Scholarship. The Andrew Grene Foundation was established in his memory, to promote education and microfinance in Haiti, through the Andrew Grene High School in Port-au-Prince and a Fonkoze branch in Aken, in southwest Haiti.

References

1965 births
2010 deaths
Victims of the 2010 Haiti earthquake